Florent Ogier (born 21 March 1989) is a French professional footballer who plays for Clermont Foot as a defender.

He joined Sochaux on 27 May 2016 along with fellow former Bourg-Péronnas defender Mickaël Alphonse.

Career statistics

References

External links
 
 
 Florent Ogier at foot-national.com

1989 births
Living people
Footballers from Lyon
French footballers
Association football defenders
Ligue 1 players
Ligue 2 players
Championnat National players
Lyon La Duchère players
Dijon FCO players
Racing Besançon players
Paris FC players
Vendée Poiré-sur-Vie Football players
Football Bourg-en-Bresse Péronnas 01 players
FC Sochaux-Montbéliard players
Clermont Foot players